Bi Any Other Name: Bisexual People Speak Out, published by Riverdale Avenue Books, is an anthology edited by Loraine Hutchins and Lani Kaʻahumanu, and is one of the seminal books in the history of the modern bisexual rights movement. It holds a place that is in many ways comparable to that held by Betty Friedan's The Feminine Mystique in the feminist movement.

The book comprises fiction and nonfiction pieces, poetry and art created by a diverse group of over seventy bisexual people speaking about their lives.

To quote Wendy Curry, longtime bisexual rights activist and former president of the American national bisexual civil rights group BiNet USA,

This book helped spark at least ten other books (many by its own contributors), was named one of Lambda Book Report's Top 100 Queer Books of the 20th century, has been reprinted 3 times since 1991, has over 40,000 copies in circulation, and was translated and published in Taiwan in June 2007.  It also frequently appears on numerous LGBT reading lists, from assistance in coming out to queer studies curriculum guides.

In 1992, despite requests from the bisexual community for a more appropriate and inclusive category, Bi Any Other Name: Bisexual People Speak Out was forced to compete (and lose) in the category "Lesbian Anthology" at the Lambda Literary Awards.  Additionally, in 2005, Directed by Desire: Collected Poems, a posthumous collection of the bisexual Jamaican American writer June Jordan's work, had to compete (and win) in the category "Lesbian Poetry". Led by BiNet USA, and assisted by other bisexual organizations including the American Institute of Bisexuality, BiPOL, and Bialogue, the bisexual community launched a multi-year struggle that eventually culminated in 2006 with the addition of a Bisexual category at the Lambda Literary Awards.

A 25th anniversary edition of the book was released in 2015 during Bi Awareness Week.

References

External links
 Bi Any Other Name on publisher's site Alyson Publications
 Bi Any Other Name on Facebook
 review International Gay & Lesbian Review
 Loraine Hutchins (editor)
 Lani Kaʻahumanu (editor)

1990s LGBT literature
1991 anthologies
Books about bisexuality
LGBT literature in the United States
LGBT anthologies
Alyson Books books